In Search of a Golden Sky is a 1984 adventure-drama film released by Comworld Pictures. In the film, three orphan children find solace in their uncle's wilderness home after their mother has died.

Production
Shot on location in the state of Utah, Golden Sky was completed in 1982, but not released until two years later. It received a video release in early 1987 on CBS/Fox's Playhouse label. The bears and foxes were trained by employees of Heber City, Utah's Wasatch Rocky Mountain Wildlife and Thousand Oaks, California's Animal Actors of Hollywood.

Cast
 Charles Napier as T. J. Rivers
 George Buck Flower as Zep Morrison
 Cliff Osmond as Russ McGuire
 Anne Szesny as Luanne Morrison
 Shane Wallace as Randy Morrison
 Junior Richard as Marcus Morrison
 Josanne Wayman as Irene Rivers
 Beverly Rowland as Aunt Marcy (credited as Beverly Booth Rowland)
 Stafford Morgan as David Morrison
 Eric Hart as Arthur Sutton
 Craig Clyde as Eddie Briggs
 Jesse Bennett as Carl Hodges
 Bob Lee as Jerry Doyle
 Lynne Van Dam as Mrs. Bonner
 David A.J. Hampshire as Bob Hoskins
 John R. Hanskat as Chet Ford
 Don Gomes as Tom Duffy

Reception
Utah's Deseret News gave the film one and a half stars out of four.  The "dreadful family picture", it commented, "[has] one of the most ridiculously contrived, unintentionally humorous endings ever".

References

External links 
 
 

1984 films
1984 drama films
Films shot in Utah
American independent films
1980s English-language films
1980s American films